Side Effects is an anthology of 17 comical short essays written by Woody Allen between 1975 and 1980, all but one of which were previously published in, variously, The New Republic, The New York Times, The New Yorker, and The Kenyon Review. It includes Allen's 1978 O. Henry Award-winning story "The Kugelmass Episode".

Contents
 Remembering Needleman
 The Condemned
 By Destiny Denied
 The UFO Menace
 My Apology
 The Kugelmass Episode
 My Speech to the Graduates
 The Diet
 The Lunatic's Tale
 Reminiscences: Places and People
 Nefarious Times We Live In
 A Giant Step for Mankind
 The Shallowest Man
 The Query
 Fabrizio's: Criticism and Response 
 Retribution
 Confessions of a Burglar

Some of the tales in detail
"Remembering Needleman" is a one-liner- and non-sequitur-filled obituary for Professor Sandor Needleman.
"By Destiny Denied" presents the reader with notes for a fictional "eight-hundred-page novel—the big book they're all waiting for."
"My Apology" is Allen's tale of a recurring fantasy/dream of his where he imagines himself in the sandals of Socrates during the philosopher's final days in prison.
"The Kugelmass Episode" is about a CCNY professor, Sidney Kugelmass, who, thanks to the powers of an obscure magician, is projected into Madame Bovary to carry on an affair beyond the scrutiny of his overbearing wife.
"My Speech to the Graduates" is a parody of platitude-laden commencement speeches.
"Nefarious Times We Live In" concerns the events that lead its protagonist, Willard Pogrebin, to fire a Luger at President Gerald Ford. They involve at least five kinds of drugs and three cults.

Running jokes
Throughout the book, frequent references are made to composer Igor Stravinsky. In addition, numerous gags are made with an implication that people bear an innate knowledge of Dutch. Characters' love interests are compared to a grotesque, golem-like Aunt Rifka in two separate stories.

References

External links
 Profile on Google Books
 Woody Allen's bibliography

1980 short story collections
Comedy books
American short story collections
Short story collections by Woody Allen
Random House books

pt:Side Effects